Wild Seed is the second studio album and first English-language album by Norwegian pop singer Morten Harket. The album was released on 4 September 1995 through Warner Bros. Records. After a-ha went on a hiatus in 1994, Harket began recording Wild Seed with British record producer Christopher Neil, who previously worked with the band on their fourth studio album, East of the Sun, West of the Moon (1990). Wild Seed charted at number one in Norway and at number 89 in the United Kingdom. It has since sold 160.000 copies in Norway.

Critical reception

Upon its release, Caroline Sullivan of The Guardian commented: "The A-ha frontman's solo debut reveals that, all this time, a poet's soul dwelt beneath that camera-pleasing exterior. Harket's brooding balladry calls to mind John Martyn and his sultry like, with a touch of Leonard Cohen in his low voice on "Brodsky Tune". If he's not as gifted a lyricist, he's got a lovely grasp of the rhythm of language."

Track listing

"Brodsky Tune" lyrics from the poem "Bosnia Tune" by Joseph Brodsky, chorus by Morten Harket.
"Lay Me Down Tonight", "Tell Me What You See" and "Stay" are based on a Norwegian poem by Håvard Rem.

References

1995 albums
Morten Harket albums
Albums produced by Christopher Neil